Metnaj is a village in the hills north of Stična in the Municipality of Ivančna Gorica in central Slovenia. The area is part of the historical region of Lower Carniola. The municipality is now included in the Central Slovenia Statistical Region.

Church

The local church is dedicated to Mary Magdalene and belongs to the Parish of Stična. It was originally a Romanesque building that was extensively remodelled in the 17th and 19th centuries.

References

External links

Metnaj on Geopedia

Populated places in the Municipality of Ivančna Gorica